The Nature Reserve of Decima-Malafede is a protected natural area of Lazio, Italy, entirely included in the territory of the Municipality of Rome. It has an area of approximately 6,145 hectares.

The Reserve was established in 1997.

The park is in the southwest zone of the city of Rome, bounded by the Grande Raccordo Anulare, the Via Pontina, the Via Laurentina  and the territory of the Municipality of Pomezia.

The park is notable for its population of wild boars, while sedimentary rocks contain human prehistoric remains.

See also
Castel di Decima
Malafede
Castello di Decima

Sources
 Translated from Italian Wikipedia.

Notes

External links

Official website
Agrinet
Il parco
Geology
 
 

Parks in Rome
Nature reserves in Italy